The Mercedes-Benz BlueZERO concept is Mercedes' attempt at the alternative fuel vehicle movement. The BlueZERO is a flexible concept that has the ability to accommodate the three different types of future alternative fuels: electric, hybrid, and hydrogen fueled. It was first introduced at the 2009 Detroit Auto Show which took place January 11–25. It features a single vehicle architecture that accommodates three models with different electric power-train configurations, each of which are fully developed and ready for testing. The Mercedes-Benz BlueZERO electric drive system gives each model the same performance specifications for acceleration and top speed.

The BlueZERO Concept serves as a stand-alone vehicle and was a launching pad for future Mercedes-Benz hybrid vehicles. The car had a second generation and also had a sister model which was slightly larger called the B-class.

Design
The technology is uniformly packaged in all three BlueZERO variants. The front end is dominated by the radiator grille with its centrally located star. The aerodynamics of the BlueZERO are partly due to the closed front apron, whose design means that cooling air intakes are not required. The 20-inch wheels were also aerodynamically optimized, while the low-friction tires reduce rolling resistance. The character lines along the flanks lend the BlueZERO a dynamic side line and accentuate its nature-inspired structure. Some argue that Mercedes took a page from the BMW styling handbook with its bionic look. 

The compact rear end of the Concept BlueZERO is characterized by its curvy tail lights. The Mercedes designers also achieved a new-quality light production: transparent lenses that produce a red light curtain which tapers towards the sides, creating a lightly diffused effect. This effect is repeated in white by the front headlamps. The front lights feature lens technology and a plexiglas edge to produce "C" shaped daytime driving lights with the help of LED headlamp technology.

Translucent surfaces make the normally concealed technology visible. The light-grey tailgate is made completely from lightweight yet robust Polycarbonate that allows a view of the aluminium structure that makes up the rigidifying frame. In addition, the transparent tailgate provides a view of the vehicle interior, putting the advantages of the sandwich-floor platform in view: the luggage compartment and passenger area remain fully usable since there are no technical components that need to be accommodated there.

Architecture 
The BlueZERO concept is based on a single architecture, a sandwich-floor architecture, which allows all of the drive components to be located on this sandwich floor design. This makes it possible to obtain a low center of mass and also leaves ample trunk and interior space. No compromises were made when it comes to passenger space or luggage capacity. With all the major power-train components located between the axles, the BlueZERO achieved a high passenger safety standard commonly associated with Mercedes.

Variants 
BlueZERO F-Cell is the fuel cell vehicle version. The F-cell would contain a fuel cell and most likely use a hydrogen fuel source, maintaining the green aspect of the vehicle. This will allow the vehicle to attain a  range. 

The BlueZERO F-CELL will suit communities where plans for hydrogen fuel delivery capability are at an advanced stage, like in the state of California, or in Germany and France.

Battery electric vehicles 
BlueZERO E-Cell is the battery electric vehicle, with 35 kWh battery capacity (that gives an only-electric range), a compact electric motor producing  (continuous output of ) that is going to be produced in 2010.

BlueZERO E-Cell Plus is a series plug-in hybrid vehicle (extended range electric vehicle), that includes an optional use gasoline engine, which is primarily used as a generator to the on-board electric motor, with a  range on a single tank and  only-electric range. The E-CELL PLUS features a rapid charging option with a capacity of 20 kW, enough power to allow for a  cruising range in about 30 minutes.

They both use cooled lithium-ion batteries manufactured by Li-Tec that achieve a full recharge time of 2 hours.

Color options
The Mercedes-Benz designers introduced paint finishes in three new ALU-BEAM colors. Each of the three variants notes individuality: the BlueZERO E-Cell is painted in an ALU-BEAM Yellow, while the BlueZERO F-Cell has ALU-BEAM Green paintwork. ALU-BEAM Orange was chosen for the BlueZERO E-Cell PLUS.

History
The BlueZERO was a joint venture partnership project between Daimler and Evonik Industries. Daimler used the battery and hybrid ideas of Evonik Industries to produce this vehicle. Mercedes expanded upon the BlueZERO project with an updated F-Cell roadster called the B-Class in 2008-2009. Original plans called for a hydrogen fuel cell model.

The Mercedes-Benz B-Class Electric Drive sales started worldwide in 2014, using a lithium-ion battery pack from Tesla Motors.

Environmental impact
The Mercedes-Benz BlueZERO has a minimal, almost absent carbon footprint. The BlueZERO is similar to many other hybrid vehicles in the fact that it achieves lower emissions and greater fuel economy than its internal combustion engine vehicle counterparts. These environmental gains are achieved by using its electric motor and fuel cell combined to optimize peak power or fuel economy depending on the mode the car is set on. The batteries are also capable of recharging in stop and go traffic due to the on-board engine-generator in the F-Cell. The BlueZERO is also able to save energy by shutting down its electric motor when it is stopped.

See also
 Efficient energy use
 List of hybrid vehicles
 List of modern production plug-in electric vehicles
 Mercedes-Benz B-Class Electric Drive

References

Hybrid vehicles
BlueZERO
Partial zero-emissions vehicles
Hatchbacks